Liniers may refer to:

Liniers, a barrio (neighborhood) of Buenos Aires, Argentina
Liniers, Vienne, a commune in the Vienne department, France
Santiago de Liniers, 1st Count of Buenos Aires, a French officer in Spanish service, viceroy of the Spanish colony of Río de la Plata
Liniers (cartoonist), an Argentine cartoonist